The 2021 Formula One Esports Series was the fifth season of the Formula One Esports Series. It started on 13 October 2021, and ended on 16 December 2021. It was held in Formula One's official 2021 game. Same as the previous year, the championship was held online due to COVID-19 pandemic and streamed on the official F1 YouTube Channel.

Jarno Opmeer and Red Bull Racing Esports entered the season as the reigning champion, having won the Drivers' and Team's Championship title respectively in 2020. Jarno Opmeer successfully defended the Drivers' Championship title for the second consecutive year, while his team, Mercedes-AMG Petronas Esports Team secured the Teams' Championship title for the first time since 2018.

Teams and drivers

Calendar

Results

Season summary

Championship Standings

Scoring system 

Points were awarded to the top 10 classified finishers in the race and one point was given to the driver who set the fastest lap inside the top ten. No extra points are awarded to the pole-sitter.

In the event of a tie at the conclusion of the championship, a count-back system is used as a tie-breaker, with a driver's/constructor's best result used to decide the standings.

Drivers' Championship standings

Teams' Championship standings  

 Notes: 
The standings are sorted by best result, rows are not related to the drivers. In case of tie on points, the best positions achieved determined the outcome.

References

External links 
 

Formula One Esports Series
Esports
2021 in esports